Nanxiang North railway station is a railway station on the Shanghai–Nanjing Intercity Railway located in the Jiading District of Shanghai, China.

Railway stations in Shanghai
Stations on the Shanghai–Nanjing Intercity Railway